Richard Sharp Smith (July 7, 1853 – February 8, 1924) was an English-born American architect, associated with Biltmore Estate and Asheville, North Carolina. Clay Griffith with the North Carolina State Historic Preservation Office says, "The influence of Richard Sharp Smith’s architecture in Asheville and western North Carolina during the first quarter of the twentieth century cannot be overstated." His vernacular style combines elements of Craftsman, Colonial Revival, English cottage, Shingle, and Tudor Revival architectural styles. He is associated with some of America's important architectural firms of the late 19th century—Richard Morris Hunt, Bradford Lee Gilbert, and Reid & Reid.

Background 
Smith was born in Yorkshire, England, the son of Saleta (nee Watterson) and Jones Smith. He is thought to have studied architecture at the Kensington School of Art in London. He received additional architectural training in the office of a cousin, George Smith.  He worked with various firms in Manchester before immigrating to the United States in 1882.

Career 
In 1882, Smith became an architect with Reid Brothers in Evansville, Indiana, an architectural and engineering firm. As Reid & Reid, this firm would go on to be one of the most important architects in San Francisco of that era; however, Smith only worked with them for a year. In 1883, he moved to New York City to work with the noted architect Bradford Lee Gilbert. Under Gilbert, Smith supervised the design and construction of railroad stations. However, in that era, Gilbert was also working on mansions for New York City's millionaires and a hotel, so  Smith was exposed to a range of projects.

Biltmore 

In 1886, Smith joined the firm of Richard Morris Hunt, at his New York City office. In 1889, Hunt assigned Smith to be the supervising architect for George W. Vanderbilt's Biltmore in Asheville, North Carolina. Biltmore was planned to be more than the largest home in America; it was also to be a working estate with expansive grounds designed by landscape architect Frederick Law Olmsted.

Smith oversaw the receipt of all materials and Biltmore's construction, along with supervising the principal contractor D.C. Weeks and the work of carpenters, masons, metalworkers, painters, plasterers, stone carvers, stonecutters, wood carvers, and related craftsmen. Smith ordered limestone from the Hallowell Stone Company of Bedford, Indiana, and cement from the J.B. Speed Company of Louisville, Kentucky, based on weekly usage, which he calculated based on the number of workmen and their skillset, the type of work being done, and the weather.

Yet, Smith was more than just a supervising architect; he designed many secondary buildings, cottages, and other structures for the estate while on site. One of the most visible today is the Mule Stable which is now used as the Deerpark restaurant. He also designed Eastcote, a residence for Chauncey Beadle who was sent by Olmsted to supervise the estate's nursery operations. Eastcote is a two-story traditional-styled house with a pebble-dash finish. Smith also designed River Cliff Cottage in 1892 as a place for Vanderbilt's friends to stay during construction. Olmsted and his wife are probably the most important guest who stayed in this brick and rough=cast house which no longer exists. He also renovated the B. J. Alexander house, an existing structure on the property, to serve as Vanderbilt's residence during the construction of Biltmore.

The estate's Walled Garden complex was a collaborative design of Olmsted, Hunt, and Smith—according to Olmsted. On October 30, 1891, Smith writes Hunt, "This day I send you by express blueprints of Vegetable Garden Walls for your approval. I have also enclosed a copy for Mr. Olmsted should you think it necessary he should see what we are about to do. I don’t think he has been consulted on the changes and additions, viz. setting back of Gardener’s Cottage twelve feet from entrance and the retreat and tool house northwest corner of garden. These changes seem to meet with Mr. Vanderbilt’s approval." The last line also indicates that, after a year, Smith worked directly with their client, rather than through Hunt.

Smith also designed the Gardener's Cottage and the gates for the garden. Smith's other grounds-related projects include designing five iconic brick bridges for the estate in the early 1890s; these were constructed of bricks produced by the estate's brickworks and feature a Tudor-arch profile. One spans the stream that feeds the bass pond and includes pedestrian overlooks in its side walls. On 8 April 1892, Smith wrote Hunt, "The bridge plans are nearly completed, and will be sent you early next week. I think a brick arch will answer, the pressure per foot is 6 tons. This should be safe for brick. As to the appearance, stone would be a pleasing change." The cost to excavate and build this on a brick bridge was $9,570.

Although Vanderbilt and Smith appear to have discussed designs directly, Smith still sent his work to New York for Hunt's approval and to get the firm's official stamp. In addition, Smith sent Hunt weekly reports, and they had a go-between who would come to Asheville periodically, while Hunt worked on other projects. When Hunt died in July 1895, his son Richard Howland Hunt, who had worked on some of the secondary buildings for the estate, took over management of the firm.  At this point, Smith hired extra workers, pushing the project toward an end. In the spring of 1896, Smith writes a letter to an associate indicating his plans to depart Biltmore for a proposed trip to Europe, after which he will return to Asheville and set up his architectural practice. Smith wrote, “So far as Estate work is concerned, I am unable to say as Mr. Hunt wishes me to stay until everything is completed at Biltmore House”

Smith was on-site at Biltmore from the start of construction in the summer of 1890 through essentially the house's completion in the fall of 1896, However, through his new practice, he would remain Vanderbilt's architect of choice for decades. Biltmore Estate and its related buildings are a National Historic Landmark.

R. S. Smith Architect 

In the fall of 1896, Smith established his private practice in the Paragon Building in Asheville. He advertised as "R. S. Smith, Architect, Paragon Building. Eight years with the late Mr. R. M, Hunt. Six years resident architect for G. W. Vanderbilt, Esq." During his first five years in practice, 1896 to 1901, Smith received sixty commissions.

Vanderbilt continued to be a client. He commissioned the Young Man's Institute, the first building Smith designed in Asheville. The YMI was a recreational center for Asheville's African Americans, many of whom worked for Vanderbilt, but also included spaces for shops and a doctor on the first floor. The YMI was given the same architectural styling as the structures in Biltmore Village.

Vanderbilt also hired Smith to design a "manorial village" outside the entrance of the estate. The resulting Biltmore Village included residential cottages, shops, a post office, and a hospital. Biltmore Village ensured an attractive "look" for the neighborhood surrounding his home's entrance would meet Vanderbilt's expectations, while also modeling what ideal village living could be like. Smith designed more than 24 buildings for Biltmore Village from 1900 to 1920. This included all structures in the village except All Soul's Church, the Biltmore Estate Office, and the depot which were designed by Hunt previously.

Smith also designed five large rental cottages, actually mansions, across the Swannanoa River on Vernon Hill overlooking Biltmore for Vanderbilt. Sunnicrest is the only surviving cottage, but it has recently been restored by its owner, Asheville-Buncombe Technical Community College.

His other early commissions were for houses and cottages in the Montford and Chestnut Hill neighborhoods of Asheville. Many of the homes designed have similar characteristics to those he designed for Biltmore Village Biltmore Estate's 's Curator of Interpretation said, “Two beautiful examples of Richard Sharp Smith’s residential style—the Annie West House at 189 Chestnut Street in Chestnut Hill and the Charles Jordan House at 296 Montford Avenue—include pebbledash stucco, archways, and rooflines, much like his buildings in Biltmore Village.” The Preservation Society of Asheville & Buncombe County describes Smith's "true legacy to Asheville" as his signature 'Biltmore-style' with its blend of English Arts and Craft styling combined with Elizabethan Tudor and Old World influences."

Smith was very protective of his designs and "imitation of his work was a source of great irritation to him." In 1897, he sued builder James M. Westall for using his designs without permission, especially exterior features. Westall had previously built houses for Smith and went out on his own, undercutting costs by eliminating the architect.

Smith & Carrier 
Around 1905, Smith began working with Albert Heath Carrier (1878 – 1961), a Michigan-born engineer and inventor who moved to Asheville in 1884. Carrier looked after the mechanical and structural engineering aspects of their projects, freeing Smith to be creative and to pursue more clients.  Smith's motto was, “We can do anything and we will.” In 1910, the duo incorporated as Smith & Carrier.

Between 1900 and 1920, Smith designed almost every significant building in downtown Asheville. His additions included hotels, medical buildings, office buildings, schools, and theaters. Some key buildings that no longer survive include the Asheville Club (remodeled into the Miles Building in 1925), the City Auditorium (encapsulated by the Asheville Civic Center, now called Harrah's Cherokee Center), the Langren Hotel, the Majestic Theater, the Pack Theater, the Plaza Theater, the Oates Building, the Paragon Building, St Genevieve's of the Pines Dormitory, Vance Public School, and the YMCA. He also designed courthouses for Henderson, Jackson, Madison, and Swain Counties. Smith was a practical choice for these institutional structures; he was the first architect in the region "to use fire-proof reinforced concrete construction."

Smith was also commissioned to design a monument for former North Carolina Governor Zebulon Vance as the centerpiece to Asheville's Pack Square. This 65-foot tall granite obelisk was removed in 2021 because of Vance's was a Confederate, slave owner, and documented racist.

With more than 30 structures by him, the Montford Area Historic District in Asheville has the greatest concentration of Smith's buildings outside of Biltmore Village, but many fine examples of his work can be found in Asheville's Albemarle Park, Chestnut Hill Historic District, and Grove Park. When Smith died in 1924, Smith & Carrier had designed more than 700 buildings. After Smith's death, Carrier completed some open commissions but did not do much more.

Professional affiliations 
In 1901, Smith became president of the Southeastern Architectural League. He was one of the five founding members of the North Carolina Chapter of the American Institute of Architects in 1913. He was president of the NC-AIA in 1917 and vice president in 1921. In 1915, Smith became the 36th architect in North Carolina to receive a license under the new Practice Act of 1915.

Personal 
After moving to Asheville, Smith never returned to England. However, he "remained an English gentleman in his demeanor and appearance—tailored tweed suits, English walking caps, and cane."

Smith's second wife was Isabella Cameron, a native of Scotland. Smith met Cameron when she was a member of the household staff at Biltmore. They had four children—Emily, Sylvia, Hampden, and Richard Jr. Initially, the family lived in a rental house near downtown Asheville and on Blake Street in the Montford neighborhood.

In 1902, Smith purchased 27 acres at the head of Chunns Cove, east of downtown Asheville, for $1,000. There, Smith built his family's rustic home, Stoneybrook, using local stone; it was completed by 1903. The Asheville Citizen-Times wrote, “The quiet forms and rustic character of the house—the home of his family—most likely exist as an expression of Smith’s personality and his family life." For several years, carriage access to Stoneybrook was limited to eight months a year. The family rented a house in Asheville for the other months. As more people moved into Chunns Cove, the road and access were improved. However, Smith loved the outdoors and was known to walk the three miles over Beaucatcher Mountain from his house to Asheville, rather than using the family carriage or car. Stoneybrook is now on the National Register of Historic Places.

Smith served on the vestry of St. Mary’s Episcopal Church in Asheville—he designed the church's Gothic Revival style building in 1914. He was also a member of the British American Club and the Asheville's Scottish Rite Masonic order, another group he designed a building for in 1913.

Smith died in 1924 at the age of 72 after several months of illness. He is buried in Riverside Cemetery in Asheville, After his death, his family continued to live in Stoneybrook despite financial challenges. Mrs. Smith sold to Walter Westwood in 1926, but purchased it back at auction in 1928 after Westwood defaulted on his loan. However, she sold off acreage over time, eventually selling the house again in 1932. She lived in the Chestnut Hill neighborhood of Asheville until she died in 1966.

Projects 
The following is a selected list of Smith's buildings that survive. Most are listed on the National Register of Historic Places (NRHP) or are included in a National Register Historic District (NRHD) or a Main Street National Historic District (MSHD) or National Historic Landmark (NHL).

Notes

See also 
 Richard Morris Hunt
 Bradford Gilbert
 Reid & Reid

References

External links 
 Richard Sharp Smith Profile Architects & Builders

1852 births
1924 deaths
English architects
People from North Carolina
People from Asheville, North Carolina
19th-century American architects
20th-century American architects
Architects from North Carolina
Companies based in Asheville, North Carolina
Architecture firms based in North Carolina
Defunct architecture firms of the United States
Design companies established in 1910
American Freemasons
19th-century American Episcopalians
20th-century American Episcopalians